Timofey Dmitriyevich Skatov (born 21 January 2001) is a Kazakhstani tennis player of Russian descent. He has a career-high ATP singles ranking of World No. 125, achieved on 13 February 2023 and No. 724 in doubles, achieved on 16 January 2023. He is the current No. 2 Kazakhstani player. Skatov had a career-high ITF junior combined ranking of No. 1 achieved on 1 January 2018.

Professional career

2020-21: ATP debut & first win, First Challenger final, Top 250
Skatov made his ATP debut at the 2020 Astana Open in Nur-Sultan as a wildcard where he lost to Emil Ruusuvuori.

In June 2021, he reached his first Challenger final as a wildcard in Almaty where he lost to Zizou Bergs.

He won his first ATP match also as a wildcard at the 2021 Astana Open in Kazakhstan defeating Andreas Seppi.

2022: Grand Slam and top 150 debut
Skatov made his first Grand Slam main draw appearance after successfully making it all the way through in the 2022 Australian Open qualifications, defeating Hugo Grenier, Dane Sweeny, and Gastão Elias.
He lost in the first round to Slovakian qualifier Norbert Gombos.

He reached his second Challenger final as an alternate at the 2022 Parma Challenger and won the title. As a result, he moved 57 positions up and reached a new career-high just outside the top 150 at No. 152 on 10 October 2022.

Personal life
In May 2018, Skatov switched nationalities to represent his birth country, Kazakhstan.

Performance Timeline

Current through the 2023 Australian Open

Future and Challenger finals

Singles: 8 (4–4)

References

External links

2001 births
Living people
Russian male tennis players
Kazakhstani male tennis players
People from Petropavl